Przerośl  is a village in Suwałki County, Podlaskie Voivodeship, in north-eastern Poland. It is the seat of the gmina (administrative unit) called Gmina Przerośl.

The village has a population of 3,300.

History

Settled in 1570, Przerośl received town privileges in 1576 from Stephen Báthory elected king of Poland in the same year, but lost them 1870 due to migration. Even though its population has decreased and administratively it is now only a village, its past is reflected in the urban pattern of its street layout, with a prominent town square.  For much of its history the town had a significant Jewish community, which perished during the Holocaust in occupied Poland, and was not re-established afterwards.

References

Villages in Suwałki County
Białystok Voivodeship (1919–1939)
Holocaust locations in Poland